The 1973 Coppa Italia Final was the final of the 1972–73 Coppa Italia. The match was played on 1 July 1973 between Milan and Juventus. Milan won 5–2 on penalties after the match ended 1–1 after extra time.

Match

References 
Coppa Italia 1972/73 statistics at rsssf.com
 https://www.calcio.com/calendario/ita-coppa-italia-1972-1973-finale/2/
 https://www.worldfootball.net/schedule/ita-coppa-italia-1972-1973-finale/2/

Coppa Italia Finals
Coppa Italia Final 1973
Coppa Italia Final 1973
Coppa Italia Final 1973